Salvia sagittata is a herbaceous perennial plant that is native to the Andes Mountains, growing at elevations from . The specific epithet refers to the arrow-shaped leaves. The plant was collected and named in 1798 by Hipólito Ruiz López and José Antonio Pavón Jiménez, two Spanish botanists who spent ten years in Peru and Chile on a commission by the government of Spain to go to the New World in search of new medicinal and agricultural plants.

It is covered with yellow-green leaves that are rugose on the upper surface—with the underside covered with short white hairs and heavily veined. The  flowers are a brilliant blue, with a spreading lower lip. A pistil and two yellow stamens show in the upper lip.

Notes

sagittata
Flora of Peru
Plants described in 1798